Unlike formal reports, informal technical reports are used for daily communication within a corporation or workplace. The parts of an informal technical report generally include a heading, introduction, summary, discussion/feedback, and conclusion. A  recommendations section and or attachments section may be included if necessary.

Heading 
Though some organizations have their own template for informal report headings, most headings include the date, a name for who the formal report is being addressed to, a name for who the report is from, a subject, a reference, action required, and a distribution list. The Date, To, From, and Subject are all crucial portions of the heading. Alternatively, the Reference, Action Required, and Distribution list may be used depending on the circumstance and content of the report. A Reference should be used if the report is related to a previous report or is a response to another informal report. The Action Required may be necessary if receivers must respond by a certain date or time. Lastly, a Distribution List should be included if it is necessary for all readers to be aware of who is receiving the report, in addition to the file name.  A sample format is as follows
 
Date:6 July 2018

To:MOBILITY TECHNOLOGIES

From:SUPIMENS SECURITY SYSTEM

Subject:REPORT ON SECURITY SYSTEMS

Reference:

Action Required:

Distribution List:

Introduction 
The introduction of the report should concisely summarize what the report is going to cover. Additionally, the introduction should include a purpose, any helpful background information, and the order of the content.

Summary 
The summary should cover the key points addressed in the report. If appropriate, the introduction and summary may be combined when using informal technical reports.

Discussion/Feedback 
The discussion portion of the report should be used to cover each main point that it introduced in the summary. This section should be reserved for elaborating on the key points and discussing any potential issues that the readers may need to be aware of. Additionally, the author may include any interpretations or opinion in this section.

Conclusion 
The conclusion portion of the report should summarize all of the key points addressed and restate the most important points that readers should take away from the report.

Recommendations 
The recommendations section should be reserved for proposing any solutions to the issues addressed in the discussion/feedback section.

Attachments  
The attachment section should be utilized for any extra documents containing data or supporting evidence necessary to support the key point addressed in the report.

References 

 
 

Communication